The following is a list of the largest cities by population and of capital cities in the geographic region of East Africa. Because population counts in each country occur at different times, the list of numbers is meant as a rough indicator of relative size.

List of capital cities

See also

 List of metropolitan areas in Africa
 Lists of cities in Africa, mostly by country
 List of largest cities in the Arab world
 Urbanization in Africa

References

Cities
.east